Ati (Inati), or Binisaya nga Inati, is an Austronesian language of the island of Panay in the Philippines. The variety spoken in northern Panay is also called Sogodnin. The Ati people also speak Kinaray-a and Hiligaynon.

Classification
 and  consider Inati to be an isolate within the Philippine languages. It differs markedly from the Visayan languages and has many features not found in the Central Philippine languages.

Inati shows some unique sound changes.
Proto-Malayo-Polynesian *R > Inati , such as PMP * > Inati 

Distribution and dialects
 lists the following Ati communities in the Philippines, with populations given in parentheses:

Iloilo (1,902): Anilao (341), Barotac Viejo (867), Cabatuan (31), Calinog (163), Dueñas (43), Dumangas (50), Janiuay (22), New Lucena (59), Passi (103), San Miguel (17), San Rafael (110), Santa Barbara (12), Tigbauan (69), San Joaquin (15)
Antique (4,680): Anini-y (156), Hamtic (3,081), Tobias Fornier (1,383), San Jose (60)
Capiz (308): Dumarao (308)
Aklan (740+): Buruanga (?), Malay (740)
Guimaras (789): Buenavista (189), Jordan (237), Sibunag (178), Nueva Valencia (185) 
Negros Occidental (309): Isabela (309)
Romblon: Odiongan and Calatrava on Tablas Island, and San Jose on Carabao Island (unknown population size)

 lists the following locations:
Antique: Culuasi, Hamtic, San Jose, Sibalom, Tobias
Tina, Hamtic, Antique (512 people)
Capiz: Dumarao
Iloilo: Janiuay, Anilao, Cabatuan, Duenas, Dumangas, Mina, New Lucena, Passi, San Miguel, San Joaquin, San Rafael, Santa Barbara, Tigbauan
Nagpana, Barotac Viejo, Iloilo (500 people)
Aklan
Barangay Sabang, Buruanga, Aklan (4 households, 15 people)
Barangay Jesuna, Nabas, Aklan (3 households, 20 people)
In Malay, Aklan: Barangays Argao, Cubay Norte, Cubay Sur, Cogon, Boracay (total: 63 households, 321 people)

 reports that Sogodnin is spoken by a few remaining speakers in Cogon, Malay (whose ancestors had moved from interior Sabang to Bakirohan to Cogon), and on Carabao and Boracay islands.

Ethnologue reports two dialects for Ati:

Malay (not to be confused with Malay, Malaysia.) and Barotac Viejo Nagpana. Ethnologue states that Barotac Viejo Nagpana is the prestige dialect.

References

Works cited

External links
Schools keep indigenous culture alive
The Ati of Negros and Panay
Negritos and Negros 
Beyond the beach: The untold story of Boracay’s Ati tribe
Additional resources
Inati (Jordan, Guimaras) word list (Austronesian Basic Vocabulary Database)
Inati (Hamtic) word list (Austronesian Basic Vocabulary Database)
Inati (Nagpana) word list (Austronesian Basic Vocabulary Database)
Sogodnin (Boracay) word list (Austronesian Basic Vocabulary Database)
Sogodnin (Iloilo) word list (Austronesian Basic Vocabulary Database)

Philippine languages

Endangered Austronesian languages
Aeta languages
Languages of Antique (province)
Languages of Capiz
Languages of Aklan
Languages of Iloilo
Languages of Guimaras
Languages of Negros Occidental